Shanto Keno Mastan, a film with the main role played by Manna. The film was a remake of the 1997 Bollywood film Ziddi (starring Sunny Deol and Raveena Tandon) which was remade in Tamil as Dharma (1998) and an unofficial adaptation in Kannada as One man army (1998).

Plot

Cast
 Manna
 Shahnaz 
 Misha Sawdagor
 Humayun Faridi 
 Dildar 
 Siraj Haider
 Dolly Johur 
 Abdur Razzak 
 Kabila

Music

Soundtrack

References

External links 

1990s Bengali-language films
Bengali-language Bangladeshi films
Bangladeshi romantic drama films